UFC Fight Night: Mir vs. Duffee (also known as UFC Fight Night 71) was a mixed martial arts event held on July 15, 2015, at the Valley View Casino Center in San Diego, California.

Background
The event was headlined by a heavyweight bout between former UFC Heavyweight champion Frank Mir and touted prospect Todd Duffee.

Bobby Green was expected to face Al Iaquinta at the event. However, Green pulled out of the fight on June 17 due to an ACL tear and was replaced by former WEC and Strikeforce Lightweight champion Gilbert Melendez. On July 6, it was announced that Melendez tested positive for testosterone metabolites of an exogenous origin at UFC 188. He denied using anything, but stated that he is "responsible for the products he uses and their implications". Melendez was suspended one year, effective from the date of his last bout. As a result, he was pulled from the fight against Iaquinta, who in turn, was also removed from the card.

A featherweight bout between Rani Yahya and Masanori Kanehara initially slated for UFC Fight Night 70, was shifted to this event, as several participants on that card were unable to secure travel visas in time for that event restricting their travel to the United States.

Edgar Garcia was expected to face Andrew Craig at the event. However, Garcia was forced out of the bout with an injury and was replaced by promotional newcomer Lyman Good.

Doo Ho Choi was expected to face Sam Sicilia at the event. However, Choi pulled out of the bout in late June after suffering broken ribs in training and was replaced by Yaotzin Meza.

Results

Bonus awards
The following fighters were awarded $50,000 bonuses:
Fight of the Night: Alan Jouban vs. Matt Dwyer
Performance of the Night: Frank Mir and Tony Ferguson

Reported payout
The following is the reported payout to the fighters as reported to the California State Athletic Commission. It does not include sponsor money or "locker room" bonuses often given by the UFC and also do not include the UFC's traditional "fight night" bonuses.

Frank Mir: $200,000 (no win bonus) def. Todd Duffee: $12,000
Tony Ferguson: $60,000 ($30,000 win bonus) def. Josh Thomson: $85,000
Holly Holm: $50,000 ($25,000 win bonus) def. Marion Reneau: $12,000
Manvel Gamburyan: $60,000 ($30,000 win bonus) def. Scott Jorgensen: $33,000
Kevin Lee: $36,000 ($18,000 win bonus) def. James Moontasri: $10,000
Alan Jouban: $30,000 ($15,000 win bonus) def. Matt Dwyer: $10,000
Sam Sicilia: $36,000 ($18,000 win bonus) vs. Yaotzin Meza: $16,000 
Jéssica Andrade: $32,000 ($16,000 win bonus) def. Sarah Moras: $10,000
Rani Yahya: $54,000 ($27,000 win bonus) def. Masanori Kanehara: $14,000
Sean Strickland: $34,000 ($17,000 win bonus) def. Igor Araújo: $15,000
Kevin Casey: $20,000 ($10,000 win bonus) def. Ildemar Alcântara: $20,000
Lyman Good: $20,000 ($10,000 win bonus) def. Andrew Craig: $17,000

See also
List of UFC events
2015 in UFC

References

UFC Fight Night
2015 in mixed martial arts
Mixed martial arts in San Diego
Sports competitions in San Diego
July 2015 sports events in the United States
Events in San Diego